Telestes dabar  is a species of freshwater fish in the family Cyprinidae.
It is found in Vrijeka and Opacica rivers of eastern Herzegovina.

References

Telestes
Fish described in 2012